The 2003–04 AC Ajaccio season was the club's 94th season in existence and the second consecutive season in the second division of French football. In addition to the domestic league, Ajaccio participated in this season's edition of the Coupe de France. The season covered the period from 1 July 2003 to 30 June 2004.

Competitions

Overview

Ligue 1

League table

Results summary

Results by round

Matches

Coupe de France

Coupe de la Ligue

References

External links

AC Ajaccio seasons
AC Ajaccio